There are nature centers and environmental education centers throughout the state of Florida. To use the sortable tables: click on the icons at the top of each column to sort that column in alphabetical order; click again for reverse alphabetical order.

Resources
 League of Environmental Educators in Florida

References

External links
 Map of nature centers and environmental education centers in Florida

Nature centers
 
Florida